Devendra Kunwar (born 2 December 1995) is an Indian cricketer. He made his Twenty20 debut for Odisha in the 2016–17 Inter State Twenty-20 Tournament on 3 February 2017.

References

External links
 

1995 births
Living people
Indian cricketers
Odisha cricketers
People from Bargarh
Cricketers from Odisha